Asuman Güzelce (born Ladik, Samsun, 1 April 1969) is a Turkish writer, art teacher and hattat. 

Her novel Sessiz göç was recipient of the 2008 Kaşgarli Mahmut Prize. 

Her books include Sessiz Goc, Zamanin Yakama Yapistirdiklari and Elini Kalbime Koy.

References

1969 births
Living people
Turkish writers